Coast Range, Coastal Range or Coast Mountains may refer to:

 Pacific Coast Ranges of North America
 California Coast Ranges
 Coast Mountains, often referred to as the Coast Range, a major mountain range in British Columbia, Alaska and Yukon
 Olympic Mountains in Washington
 Oregon Coast Range
 Willapa Hills in Washington, an extension of the Oregon Coast Range
 Coast Range (EPA ecoregion), an ecoregion comprising portions of the California Coast Ranges, Oregon Coast Range and the Olympic Mountains in Washington
 Chilean Coast Range
 Hai'an Range in Taiwan
 Venezuelan Coastal Range
 Syrian Coastal Mountain Range